Freegle is a UK organisation that aims to increase reuse and reduce landfill by offering a free Internet-based service where people can give away and ask for things that would otherwise be thrown away.

History 
Freegle was formed on 11 September 2009 after many Freecycle groups in the UK decided to break away from the US parent organisation following disagreements on how groups in the UK should operate and the dismissal of long-term UK moderators, who had been speaking out.

Organisation 
Each local Freegle group is run by volunteers, is autonomous and affiliates to the national Freegle Ltd organisation provided they meet basic requirements such as being free to join and everything handed on must be free and legal. Freegle Ltd is a nonprofit organization: Registered Society (previously known as an Industrial and Provident Society for Community Benefit) Registration no: 32410R. and registered as a charity with HMRC reference XT32865.

Membership numbers 

In January 2021, there were 453 groups, supported by about 449 volunteers, with 3,267,715 members in the UK.

Hosting 

Freegle groups are hosted on Freegle's own open source platform, which is available here (client) and here (server).  A lot Freegle groups are also accessible via the Trash Nothing website.

Mobile apps 

In April 2015 the Freegle mobile app was launched to allow access to Freegle Direct groups on Android, iOS and Kindle phones and tablets.

See also 
 Gift economy
 Reciprocal altruism
 Reuse
 Sharing
 Sharing economy
 Circular economy
 Waste Hierarchy

References

External links 
Official Freegle site

Recycling organizations
British environmental websites
Waste organizations
Freecycling